Nacaduba subperusia, the violet 4-lineblue, is a butterfly in the family Lycaenidae. It was described by Pieter Cornelius Tobias Snellen in 1896. It is found in the Indomalayan realm.

Subspecies
Nacaduba subperusia subperusia (Sulawesi)
Nacaduba subperusia lysa Fruhstorfer, 1916 (Sumatra, Singapore, possibly Borneo)
Nacaduba subperusia intricata Corbet, 1938 (Peninsular Malaysia)
Nacaduba subperusia nadia Eliot, 1955 (Nicobars)
Nacaduba subperusia paska Eliot, 1955 (Palawan, Philippines, Sulawesi, Sula, Maluku)
Nacaduba subperusia martha Eliot, 1955 (Roon Island, West Irian to Papua, D'Entrecasteaux, Louisiades)

References

External links
Nacaduba at Markku Savela's Lepidoptera and Some Other Life Forms

Nacaduba
Butterflies described in 1896